Ömer Çelik (born 15 June 1968) is a Turkish journalist and politician. Between 24 January 2013 and 28 August 2015 he served as Minister of Culture and Tourism. He served as the Minister of European Union Affairs and as the Chief Negotiator for Turkish Accession to the European Union between 2016–2018.

Early years
He was born on 15 June 1968 in Adana to Ziya Çelik and his wife Dudu. After graduating from Gazi University's Faculty of Economics and Administrative Sciences, he earned his master's degree in political science at the same university's Graduate School of Social Sciences.

Ömer Çelik worked as a journalist and political scientist. He joined the Justice and Development Party (AKP) and became political advisor to the party leader.

Politics
He was elected to Parliament as a deputy from Adana for three consecutive terms in 2002, 2007 and 2011. Since 2010, he has served as the Deputy Chairman responsible for Foreign Affairs. He is also the chairman of the Friendship Group of Bilateral Parliamentary Relations between Turkey and the United States.

On 24 January 2013 Ömer Çelik was appointed Minister of Culture and Tourism in the cabinet of Recep Tayyip Erdoğan replacing Ertuğrul Günay.

Personal life
Ömer Çelik is single.

References

External links
https://twitter.com/omerrcelik

Living people
1968 births
People from Adana
Gazi University alumni
Turkish journalists
Justice and Development Party (Turkey) politicians
Deputies of Adana
Ministers of Culture of Turkey
Members of the 24th Parliament of Turkey
Members of the 23rd Parliament of Turkey
Members of the 22nd Parliament of Turkey
Members of the 26th Parliament of Turkey
Members of the 65th government of Turkey
Ministers of Culture and Tourism of Turkey